The Nordic Journal of Linguistics is a peer-reviewed academic journal concerned with all branches of linguistics, but paying particular attention to theoretical linguistics and languages used in the Nordic countries. It was established in 1978 and is published by Cambridge University Press for the Nordic Association of Linguists. It is also supported by the Nordic Publication Committee for Periodicals in the Humanities.

The editors in chief from 2001-2015 were Catherine O. Ringen (University of Iowa) and Sten Vikner (Aarhus University). From 2015, the editors are Gunnar Ólafur Hansson (University of British Columbia, Canada), Marit Julien (University of Lund, Sweden) and Matti Miestamo (University of Helsinki, Finland).

Three issues are published each year, one of them devoted to a special topic.

References

External links 
 
 Nordic Association of Linguists Homepage

Cambridge University Press academic journals
Linguistics journals
Scandinavian studies
Publications established in 1978
English-language journals
Triannual journals
Academic journals associated with learned and professional societies